U-Boat 39 (Swedish: Ubåt 39) is a 1952 Swedish drama film directed by Hampe Faustman and starring Eva Dahlbeck, Karl-Arne Holmsten and Gunnel Broström. It is part of the subgenre of Submarine films. It was based on the play of the same title by Rudolf Värnlund

Synopsis
A submarine of the Swedish Navy is involved in an accident and marooned on the bottom of the sea, while on land the crew's relative anxiously wait.

Cast

 Eva Dahlbeck as 	Maria Friberg
 Karl-Arne Holmsten as 	Herman Friberg
 Gunnel Broström as 	Anna
 Erik Strandmark as 	John Nilsson
 Lars Ekborg as 	Gunnar Friberg
 Harriet Andersson as Harriet, Gunnar's Girlfriend
 Lennart Lindberg as 	Captain Sundström
 Erik Hell as 	First Mate
 Olle Florin as 	Managing director
 Erik Molin as Berg
 Gunnar Hellström as 	Harriet's Escort
 Tord Stål as 	Reverend
 Sven-Axel Carlsson as 	Crew member Malmberg 
 Axel Högel as Church warden
 Ove Tjernberg as 	Crew member
 Bibi Andersson as 	Girl on the train 
 Märta Arbin as 	Relative 
 Gösta Gustafson as 	Relative 
 Svea Holst as Relative
 Frithiof Bjärne as 	Navy officer 
 Bengt Blomgren as 	Navy officer
 Gösta Krantz as Officer 
 Eric Laurent as 	Navy commander
 Ivar Wahlgren as 	Clerk

References

Bibliography 
 Qvist, Per Olov & von Bagh, Peter. Guide to the Cinema of Sweden and Finland. Greenwood Publishing Group, 2000.

External links 
 

1952 films
Swedish drama films
1952 drama films
1950s Swedish-language films
Films directed by Hampe Faustman
1950s Swedish films